The WA Diamonds are a women's field hockey team based in Perth, Western Australia. The team compete in the women's division of the Australian Hockey League (AHL).

History
Originally known as the WAIS Diamonds, the team first competed in the AHL in 1993, changing names to WA Diamonds in 2003. They have won the AHL title 6 times, in years 1994, 2004, 2006, 2007, 2008 and 2010.

2010 WA Diamonds hockey team

2011 WA Diamonds hockey team

2012 WA Diamonds hockey team

2013 WA Diamonds hockey team

2014 WA Diamonds hockey team

2015 WA Diamonds hockey team

Earlier squad

References

Australian field hockey clubs
Sporting clubs in Perth, Western Australia
Women's field hockey teams in Australia
Field hockey clubs established in 1993